Morris Park station is a planned passenger rail station on the Metro-North Railroad New Haven Line, to be located in Morris Park, Bronx. The station is planned to open in 2027 as part of the Penn Station Access project. It will be located at Morris Park Avenue adjacent to the Albert Einstein College of Medicine, with entrances from both sides of the tracks.

History

The New Haven Railroad had two stations serving the Morris Park area. A large freight yard was located on the south side of the tracks from Eastchester Avenue to Pelham Parkway. New station buildings at both locations were designed by Cass Gilbert in 1908. The Morris Park station building survives; the new Westchester station (along with several others on the line) was never built.

A 63-month design-build contract for the Penn Station Access project was issued in December 2021.

References

Metro-North Railroad stations in New York City
Railway stations in the Bronx
Morris Park, Bronx
Railway stations scheduled to open in 2027
Stations on the Northeast Corridor
Stations along New York, New Haven and Hartford Railroad lines